The Votanikos Mosque or Athens Mosque is a mosque in the Votanikos neighbourhood of Athens, Greece. It is the first official mosque in the Greek capital since the Greek War of Independence. Athens was the only European capital without a mosque until its construction. The project faced opposition from the Greek Orthodox Church and civil protests.

History 
There are mosques from Ottoman times in Athens, such as the Tzistarakis Mosque and the Fethiye Mosque, but they function solely as archaeological monuments. Until 2014, only Orthodox Christianity, Judaism, and Islam in some areas of Greece were legally allowed to open places of worship. While there was no official mosque near Athens, more than a hundred makeshift mosques formed in the area. As of November 2020, ten have been given permission by the Greek government to continue operating but the others face being moved or shut down.

The first law passed by the Greek Parliament about constructing a ″Turkish mosque″ in the Athens area was in 1890. In 1970, conservative Arab countries offered the funding of a mosque in Athens but neither the law nor the proposal were realized. Increased immigration from Muslim countries in recent decades has made the establishment more urgent—about 200,000 Muslims live in the Athens area, many of whom are Pakistani but until recently there was no official mosque building. 

The first attempt to establish a mosque in Athens dates to Law 2833 in 2000 which envisaged its establishment at Hourmouza in Paiania and was intended to be financed by Saudi Arabia. Due to the reaction of the Church and the locals, the project stalled. In 2006, the effort was resumed with Law 3512 but with major modifications: it was decided that the construction would be financed solely by the Greek state which would retain complete control over the mosque and appoint its imam. The project was repeatedly delayed due to judicial actions by various groups- which went all the way to the Council of State-and the fact that four successive public tenders received no interest from contractors.

Construction 
The fifth tender was successful and was given to a consortium comprising four of Greece's biggest construction firms—J&P ABAX, TERNA, AKTOR, and Intrakat. The contract for the construction was signed on 10 October 2016. The location had to be cleared by the police first, as it was occupied by far-right protesters, but construction began on 4 November. The site, with a total surface of 17 stremmata, was handed over by the Hellenic Navy. Existing structures were torn down for the building of a new complex, planned to include a parking space and children's playground. The mosque was planned to an area of 1,000 m2 and comprises two areas of worship, one for men with a capacity for 500, and one for women, with a capacity of 50. The mosque was not planned to feature a minaret. The mosque was financed by the Greek state, without any outside financial support; it is the only mosque in a European capital built solely using government funds. The budget was 887,000 euros.

Opening 
The mosque was opened on 3 November 2020. The opening was delayed due to the COVID-19 pandemic. Its first and current imam is Zaki Mohammed.

See also 
 Islam in Greece
 List of mosques in Greece

References 

"Athens' first Islamic Mosque in final stages of construction," 20 September 2018,https://greekcitytimes.com/2018/09/20/first-islamic-mosque-in-athens-in-final-stages-of-construction/
"Muslim community bemoans size of Athens mosque," 3 February 2019,http://www.ekathimerini.com/238252/article/ekathimerini/news/muslim-community-bemoans-size-of-athens-mosque
"Athens mosque nearly ready to open," 4 April 2019,  http://www.ekathimerini.com/239202/gallery/ekathimerini/in-images/athens-mosque-nearly-ready-to-open 

2020 establishments in Greece
21st-century mosques
Mosques in Athens
Mosques completed in 2020
21st-century architecture in Greece